Ryan Douglas Hurst (born June 19, 1976) is an American actor, known for his roles as Gerry Bertier in Remember the Titans (2000), Sgt. Ernie Savage in We Were Soldiers (2002), Tom Clarke in Taken (2002), Opie Winston in the FX drama series Sons of Anarchy (2008–2012), Chick Hogan in Bates Motel (2015–2017), Li'l "Foster" Farrell in Outsiders (2016–2017), Beta in The Walking Dead (2019–2020), and Hector Bonner in Bosch (2019–2021). He portrayed the Norse god Thor in the 2022 video game God of War Ragnarök, for which he received a BAFTA Award nomination.

Early life
Hurst was born in Santa Monica, California, the son of Candace Kaniecki, an acting coach, who currently runs the Candace Kaniecki (Herman) Acting School, and Rick Hurst, an actor best known for playing "Deputy Cletus Hogg" in the Dukes of Hazard. He attended Santa Monica High School.
He converted to Sikhism and his Sikh name is Gobind Seva Singh.

Career
Growing up in a Hollywood family, Hurst made a very early start in show business, with a recurring role in the NBC teen situation comedy series Saved by the Bell: The New Class. In the 1998 epic war film Saving Private Ryan, Hurst portrayed Michaelson, a paratrooper who, despite a temporary hearing loss, is able to communicate to Captain John H. Miller (Tom Hanks) the approximate location of Private Ryan. In 2000, Hurst followed this with a role in Rules of Engagement and the central supporting role of Gerry Bertier in Remember the Titans. Additionally, he appeared in the war film We Were Soldiers (2002) as Sgt. Ernie Savage, played the football player Lump Hudson in the black comedy thriller film The Ladykillers (2004), and starred in the TNT police drama series Wanted (2005). From 2005 to 2007, Hurst gained recognition for portraying the recurring role of Allison DuBois' half-brother, Michael Benoit, in NBC's supernatural procedural drama series Medium.

Hurst's big break came when he was cast as Opie Winston in the FX crime drama series Sons of Anarchy. Originally a recurring cast member in the first season, he was promoted to main cast member for the following season and went on to become a fan favorite. His character, newly released from a five-year prison stint and "living right", but not making ends meet, goes back to SAMCRO to provide for his family, despite his wife's objections and his knowing the risks. Hurst's portrayal of Opie earned him the Satellite Award for Best Supporting Actor – Series, Miniseries or Television Film in 2011. Also in 2011, Hurst voiced Jedidiah in the animated box office hit Rango. He also stars in the WGN America series Outsiders. In August 2018, it was announced that he would star as Beta on AMC's The Walking Dead. His debut episode, "Guardians", premiered on March 3, 2019.

Personal life
Hurst and Molly Cookson met in 1994 and married in May 2005. Together, they founded the production company Fast Shoes. In April 2013, Hurst purchased a 3,400 square-foot home in Woodland Hills, California for $1.71 million.

Filmography

Film

Television

Video games

Awards and nominations

References

External links
 
 

1976 births
20th-century American male actors
21st-century American male actors
American male film actors
American male television actors
Living people
Male actors from Santa Monica, California
Converts to Sikhism
American Sikhs